James Cyril Aubrey George Dance (5 May 1907 – 16 March 1971) was a British Conservative Party politician. He was educated at Eton College and was in the 2nd Dragoon Guards (Queen's Bays) during World War II. He was an insurance underwriter for Lloyd's of London.

Dance was elected as Member of Parliament for Bromsgrove at the 1955 general election. He was the parliamentary private secretary to George Ward during Ward's time as Parliamentary and Financial Secretary to the Admiralty and Secretary of State for Air. Dance remained an MP until he died in office on 16 March 1971, at the age of 63. The resulting by-election was won by the Labour Party's Terry Davis.

Dance was married to Charlotte Strutt until her death; they had one child. He then remarried, to Anne Walker, and they had three children.

References

External links 
 

1907 births
1971 deaths
2nd Dragoon Guards (Queen's Bays) officers
British Army personnel of World War II
Insurance underwriters
People educated at Eton College
Conservative Party (UK) MPs for English constituencies
UK MPs 1955–1959
UK MPs 1959–1964
UK MPs 1964–1966
UK MPs 1966–1970
UK MPs 1970–1974